Jacinto Rodríguez (born 5 December 1958) is a Paraguayan footballer. He played in three matches for the Paraguay national football team from 1983 to 1985. He was also part of Paraguay's squad for the 1983 Copa América tournament.

References

External links
 

1958 births
Living people
Paraguayan footballers
Paraguay international footballers
Place of birth missing (living people)
Association football goalkeepers